Vladimir Vagin is the name of:
 Vladimir Vagin (illustrator) (born 1937), Russian illustrator, American from 1990
 Vladimir Vladimirovich Vagin (born 1982), Russian footballer